This is an incomplete list of Welsh titled gentry family seats.

See also Welsh peers and baronets

References

See also
List of family seats of English nobility
List of family seats of Scottish nobility
List of family seats of Irish nobility

Nobility, Family Seats
Nobility, Family Seats
.W

European peerage
Family seats
Lists of British nobility
Lists of office-holders in the United Kingdom